Pons Racing is a motorcycle and auto racing team owned by the British company Pons Racing UK Limited. The team principal is former 250 cc world champion, Sito Pons. In motorcycle road racing world championships, Pons has fielded riders such as Alex Barros, Max Biaggi, Loris Capirossi and Sete Gibernau. In auto racing, his team won the 2004 World Series by Nissan championship with driver Heikki Kovalainen.

Results

Motorcycle racing 

Notes
* Season still in progress.

Single-seater cars

Notes

References

External links

Spanish auto racing teams
Motorcycle racing teams
World Series Formula V8 3.5 teams
Formula Renault Eurocup teams
Auto racing teams established in 1992
1992 establishments in Spain
Motorcycle racing teams established in 1992